Petrushino is a rural locality (a village) in Kopninskoye Rural Settlement, Sobinsky District, Vladimir Oblast, Russia. The population was 32 as of 2010.

Geography 
Petrushino is located 17 km west of Sobinka (the district's administrative centre) by road. Lapino is the nearest rural locality.

References 

Rural localities in Sobinsky District